Fred Robbins (born March 25, 1977) is a former American football defensive tackle. He was drafted by the Minnesota Vikings in the second round of the 2000 NFL Draft. He played college football at Wake Forest.

Robbins also played for the New York Giants and St. Louis Rams.

Early years
Robbins attended J. M. Tate High School in Pensacola, Florida and was a student and a letterman in football and baseball. In football, he was a three-year letterman and as a senior, he was an All-City selection and an All-Northwest Florida selection.

College career
Robbins started every game for three years at defensive tackle and finished his career with 15 quarterback sacks and 44 tackles-for-loss. He was a Second-team All-ACC choice as a senior. He helped the Demon Deacons’ defense improve from 9th to 2nd in the ACC in 1999.

Professional career

Pre-draft

Minnesota Vikings
Robbins was drafted on the second round of the 2000 NFL Draft by the Minnesota Vikings. He signed a four-year $5.5 million deal with the Vikings. As a rookie in 2000, played in 8 games as a reserve and had 5 tackles and one sack. In 2001, played in 16 games with 12 starts and had 45 tackles (16 solo) and 2 sacks. In 2002, played in 16 games with 15 starts for the Vikings and recorded 41 tackles (23 solo). Robbins led the team with 7 tackles for loss and had a career-high 4 passes defensed. In 2003, he played in all 16 games with 12 starts for the Vikings and finished with 30 tackles, 5 tackles for loss, and 5 quarterback hurries and recovered one fumble.

New York Giants
On March 7, 2004, Robbins signed with the New York Giants for six years and $20 million, including a $4 million bonus. In his first season with the Giants in 2004, he started all 15 games and recorded 40 tackles (31 solo), 5 sacks, 1 interception, 2 passes defensed and 2 forced fumble. In 2005, played in all 16 regular season games with 6 starts at defensive tackle and finished the season with 23 tackles (14 solo), 1.5 sacks, 1 pass defensed and 1 fumble recovery. In 2006, Robbins started all 16 regular season games and the NFC Wild Card Game and finished with career-high totals of 62 tackles (39 solo), 5.5 sacks, 2 interceptions and 34 quarterback hurries. In 2007, he played in 16 regular season with 15 starts and started all 4 postseason games and finished with 42 tackles (21 solo), 5.5 sacks, 26 QB hurries, 10 QB hits and 1 pass defensed.

Robbins was also picked by his teammates to be a defensive captain for the 2008 season. In 2008, he started in all 14 regular season games in which he played and had 36 tackles (24 solo), 5.5 sacks and 3 passes defensed. It was the 3rd consecutive season he finished with 5.5 sacks, his career high.  He was named to the 2008 Sports Illustrated All-Pro team.

Robbins had microfracture surgery following the 2008 season, and managed just two sacks in 16 games in 2009.

NFL statistics

St. Louis Rams

Robbins signed a three-year $11.3 million contract with the St. Louis Rams. The deal included a roster bonus of $3.4 million. He was released following the 2011 season on March 12, 2012.

References

External links
Official website
New York Giants bio

1977 births
Living people
Players of American football from Pensacola, Florida
African-American players of American football
American football defensive tackles
Wake Forest Demon Deacons football players
Minnesota Vikings players
New York Giants players
St. Louis Rams players
21st-century African-American sportspeople
20th-century African-American sportspeople
Ed Block Courage Award recipients